Corythoichthys flavofasciatus, known commonly as the network pipefish, reticulate pipefish and yellow-banded pipefish, is a species of marine fish in the family Syngnathidae.

Distribution and habitat
This species can be found from the Red Sea and Eastern Africa to the Tuamotu, the Ryukyu Islands, northern Australia and the Austral Islands. It lives in tropical climate and it is associated with lagoons and coral reefs at depths from the low tide line to 25 m.

Description
These fishes have 26-36 dorsal soft rays. Body has yellow and brown stripes, while the snout is red. Males develop orange stripes and brilliant light blue spots. This species is quite similar to Corythoichthys conspicillatus.

Biology
This species is ovoviviparous. These fishes are probably monogamous and are usually found in pairs. The male carries the eggs in a ventral pouch, which is below the tail. Hatching time usually lasts 10–12 days. These fishes feed on small invertebrates especially copepods, but also small isopods and ostracods. In French Polynesia it is predated by Epinephelus merra.

Taxonomy
Some authorities consider that Corythoichthys flavofasciatus is a species which is restricted to the Red Sea and that the species found in the remainder of the Indo-Pacific is Corythoichthys conspicillatus.

Bibliography
 Fenner, Robert M.: The Conscientious Marine Aquarist. Neptune City,: T.F.H. Publications, 2001.
 Helfman, G., B. Collette y D. Facey: The diversity of fishes. Blackwell Science, Malden, Massachusetts, 1997.
 Hoese, D.F. 1986:. A M.M. Smith y P.C. Heemstra (eds.) Smiths' sea fishes. Springer-Verlag, Berlin.
 Moyle, P. and J. Cech.: Fishes: An Introduction to Ichthyology, 4th. ed., Upper Saddle River, New jersey: Prentice-Hall.
 Nelson, J.: Fishes of the World, 3rd. ed. New York: John Wiley and Sons..
 Wheeler, A.: The World Encyclopedia of Fishes, 2nd. Ed. London: Macdonald.

References

External links
 

Syngnathidae
Fish described in 1838